Ferris Independent School District is a public school district based in Ferris, Texas (US).

The Ferris ISD school district began in 1911 as a modest one campus district. After the construction of the Ferris Brick industry, the town's population grew rapidly. In 1941 the current administration building was constructed. Following was, Hazel Ingram Elementary (1968), Ferris Jr. High (1978), Ferris Intermediate, now Lee Longino Elementary (1986), Lucy Mae Mcdonald Elementary (2002), and Ferris High School (2008).  
The district is led by Superintendent James Hartman and co-led by Deputy Superintendent TJ Knight. The district serves the Ferris City Limits as well as, Bristol, Texas, parts of Southern Dallas County and the community of Trumbull, Texas.

Schools
Schools are located in the City of Ferris.
 Ferris High School (Grades 9–12)
 Ferris Junior High School (Grades 6–8)
 Lee Longino Elementary School (Grades 1–5)
 Lucy Mae McDonald Elementary School (Grades 1–5)
 Hazel Ingram Elementary School (Grades PK3–K)

Notable alumni 
Homer P. Rainey-Former University of Texas President, attended Ferris High School for one year.

External links

 

School districts in Ellis County, Texas
School districts in Dallas County, Texas
School districts established in 1911